or Paf is a money gambling operator based on the Åland Islands in Finland and owned by the regional government.

Paf offers games on the internet and on board cruise ships in the Baltic and the North Sea. The company also has physical gaming activities on Åland. Paf's mission is to generate funds for the public community on the Åland Islands. Every year, around €20 million in Paf funds are distributed by the Government of Åland to a range of projects within health, culture, education and sustainability. Paf has customers in Finland, Sweden, Estonia, Spain and Latvia and is licensed and controlled by the local Åland government.

An independent allocation board distributes Paf's profit to non-profit associations, individuals and organizations that support the local community on the Åland Islands. In 2020, the allocation board distributed a total of €15 million in Paf funds to public good in the form of grants.
 Social activities: €3,500,000
 Environmental activities: €600,000
 Youth work: €612,000
 Sport: €1,780,000
 Arts and culture activities: €2,349,000
 Leadership grants: €27,000
 Event grants: €200,000
 Other operations grants: €3,000,000
 Investment grants: €2,902,000
 Integration: €30,000

Paf is a global leader within responsible gaming. In 2018, Paf became the first money gaming company in the international market to set a loss limit for its customers. The new limit, designed to curb problem gambling, stipulates that no customer can lose more than €30,000 annually by playing at Paf. The company's other responsible gaming initiatives include prize-winning innovations for regular follow-ups of customers' gaming habits and collaboration with  Richard David Court of the Department of Psychology at Stockholm University within responsible gaming research.

Paf also arranges a biennial Responsible Gaming Summit to provide an international platform for increasing awareness regarding responsible gaming. The conference attracts gaming operators, partners, academics and decision makers to raise awareness, create transparency between stakeholders and share best practices.

History
Paf was founded in 1966 for fundraising on Åland by non-profit organizations ,  (Save the Children),  (Finnish Red Cross) and the  foundation for children.

In the early 1970s, Paf started to operate aboard car ferries registered on Åland. In 1999, Paf launched its first online games.

Since Paf is owned by the regional government of Åland and its profit is distributed to the public good, it is paramount that company operations are administered in a socially responsible way. Therefore, Paf decided to implement an annual loss limit for any customer playing at Paf. The limit entails that a single customer playing at Paf may not lose more than €25,000 annually.

Paf and Sunborn Hotel opened Casino Sunborn in Gibraltar in spring 2015. It was sold to its competitor Admiral in July 2018.

In 2021, the Finnish Supreme Court (KKO) sentenced Paf to a community fine of 250,000 euro in a case related to negligent money laundering.

Awards
In 2014, Paf was named the most socially responsible gaming company in the eGaming Review Operator Awards.

In 2017, Paf was again awarded the prize for the most socially responsible gaming company in the  eGaming Review Nordic Awards.

In 2018, Paf was awarded the prize for Best Marketing Campaign in the eGaming Review Nordics Awards.

In 2018, Paf was chosen as one of the 40 most inspiring working places in Finland by Corporate Spirit Ltd.

References

External links
 Company Homepage
 Annual Report 2017

Gambling companies of Finland
Companies of Åland
Online gambling companies of Finland